Aphananthe is a small genus of evergreen trees in the family Cannabaceae. Around six species are recognised, found in Madagascar, South-east Asia, Mexico and Australia. Leaves are alternate on the stem and toothed. Flowers are unisexual, fruit form as drupes. The generic name of Aphananthe refers to insignificant flowers. Species include Aphananthe aspera and Aphananthe philippinensis.

References

External links

Cannabaceae
Rosales genera